Diego Torres is the debut studio album by Argentine singer-songwriter Diego Torres, it was released on June 8, 1992 through RCA Records.

Track listing

"Chalamán" (Melingo)
"Estamos Juntos" (Torres/López/Tomas/Brandt)
"Puedo Decir Que Si"(Torres/López/Brandt)
"Esperándote" (Torres/López/Tomas)
"Sintonía Americana" (Abuelo/López)
"No Tengas Miedo" (Torres/López)
"Es Lo Que Siento" (López/Brandt)
"Alguien La Vio Partir" (Torres/López/Tomas)
 "Yo Te Vi" (Torres/Brandt/Carrol/Payne)
"Fiesta De Vagabundos" (Torres/López/Tomas)

Certification

References

1992 debut albums
Diego Torres albums
Spanish-language albums